Heybat-e Jahan Khanemlu (also Romanized as Heybat-e Jahān Khānemlū; also known as Zeynabābād and Zeynābād-e Jahān Khānemlū) is a village in Anjirlu Rural District, in the Central District of Bileh Savar County, Ardabil Province, Iran. At the 2006 census, its population was 112, in 23 families.

References 

Towns and villages in Bileh Savar County